David Seidler (born 1937) is a British-American playwright and film and television writer.

He is most known for writing the scripts for the stage version and screen version for the story The King's Speech. For the film, he won the Academy Award and a BAFTA for Best Original Screenplay.

Early life and family
Seidler was born in London, where he spent his early childhood. He grew up in an upper-middle class Jewish family.  His mother Doris was a print-maker and graphic artist. His father Bernard was a fur broker who bought bales of pelts on commission. He had an office in New York City.  When the Seidler family's apartment in London was bombed during the Blitz in World War II, they relocated to Lingfield in Surrey. Later in the war, the family resettled in America. The ship they sailed on was a member of a convoy of three ships; on the way one of these, carrying Italian prisoners-of-war from North Africa, was sunk by German U-boats. It was on the voyage to the US that Seidler developed a stammer, before he celebrated his third birthday.

Seidler subsequently grew up in Long Island, New York. Seidler believes that his stutter might have been a response to the emotional trauma of the war. Thinking it would make others feel uncomfortable, as a teenager he often chose to keep quiet.

Numerous forms of speech therapy failed him, until, at 16, he had a breakthrough. "I resolved that if I was going to stutter for the rest of my life, people were going to be stuck listening to me. I had been depressed, but now I was angry – I decided I deserved to be heard." That is when, in rage he spoke the 'F' word, or "naughty word" as he recalled decades later. Two weeks later he auditioned for his school play, Shaw's Androcles and the Lion and even got a small role, of a Christian getting eaten by a lion. In 2005, he used it in a scene in his stage play about George VI. Seidler later attended Cornell University, where he graduated with an A.B. in English in 1959.

As he grew older he decided to write and his first work was The Adventures of a Penny about a penny's travel from hand to hand. In an interview Seidler recalled George VI as a childhood hero, who gave him hope as he listened to his wartime speeches as a child, encouraged by his parents, "David, he was a much worse stutterer than you, and listen to him now. He's not perfect. But he can give these magnificent, stirring addresses that rallied the free world." they would say.

Career
Seidler arrived in Hollywood at the age of 40, and his first job there was writing Tucker: The Man and His Dream for Francis Ford Coppola. For some years he was a member of the Feather & Seidler writing team with Jacqueline Feather.

Always wanting to write about George VI, and being a stutterer himself, Seidler started researching in the 1970s. After finding the surviving son of Lionel Logue, Valentine Logue, a brain surgeon, he wrote him in 1981. In turn, Logue was keen to talk with Seidler and even share the notebooks his father kept while treating the King, but on the condition that he received "written permission from the Queen Mother" first. Upon writing to her, Seidler received a reply from her private secretary, asking him not to pursue the project during her lifetime. Consequently, Seidler abandoned the project in 1982.

The Queen Mother died in 2002, but Seidler didn't start the work until 2005, when he suffered from throat cancer, and returned to the story during a bout of creative work it inspired. Eventually, he wrote the first draft of his screenplay, and his then-wife and writing partner suggested that he rewrite it as a stage play, as an exercise. She felt that the "physical confines of the stage would force him to focus on the key relationships in the story, without the distractions imposed by concern for cinematic technique." In 2011 Seidler won a BAFTA award for Best Original Screenplay, and later an Academy Award for Best Original Screenplay for the film The King's Speech.

When writing the script, Seidler discovered that his own uncle, also named David and also a stutterer, had been sent to see Lionel Logue by his father (Seidler's grandfather).

Personal life
In late 2005 Seidler was diagnosed with bladder cancer, but as of 2011, he was in remission.

Writing credits

Awards and nominations

References

External links

 
 
  
 

1937 births
Living people
British male screenwriters
British television writers
English Jews
Cornell University alumni
American male screenwriters
Best Original Screenplay Academy Award winners
Best Original Screenplay BAFTA Award winners
Jewish American writers
Writers from London
People from Long Island
American television writers
American male television writers
21st-century American Jews